"The Skull" is a science fiction short story by American writer Philip K. Dick, first published in 1952 in If, and later in The Collected Stories of Philip K. Dick. It has since been republished several times, including in Beyond Lies the Wub in 1988.

Plot synopsis
Conger, the protagonist, is given a chance to get out of jail if he agrees to kill a man that has died 200 years ago. Conger is given a skull from which he can identify the man, and is sent back in time in a capsule. People stare at Conger as he is dressed up strangely and has a strange accent. As Conger prepares for the man's arrival, he discovers that the skull is his own, and he is the man who will change the world, as people around town begin to take interest in the time traveller. Due to the use of time travel, Conger realizes that even though he will die, another version of himself will reappear in a few months, as if resurrected.

External links

 
 
 
 

1952 short stories
Short stories by Philip K. Dick
Works originally published in If (magazine)
Short fiction about time travel